Moo goo gai pan is the Americanized version of a Cantonese dish – chicken with mushroom in oyster sauce, which can be a stir-fry dish or a dish made in a claypot. The Chinese-American version is a simple stir-fried dish with thin sliced chicken, white button mushrooms, and other vegetables. The chicken is thinly sliced as the word ;  means thin slices. Popular vegetable additions include bok choy, snow peas, bamboo shoots, shiitake mushrooms, water chestnuts, carrots, and/or Chinese cabbage (Napa cabbage).

Etymology
The name comes from the Cantonese names of the ingredients (note that tone marks here do not match Mandarin tones):

moo goo: 'button mushrooms'
gai: 'chicken'
pan: 'slices'

See also

List of chicken dishes

References

American Chinese chicken dishes
Cantonese words and phrases